Chester is a city in Cheshire, England. It contains over 650 structures that are designated as listed buildings by English Heritage and included in the National Heritage List for England. Of these, over 500 are listed at Grade II, the lowest of the three gradings given to listed buildings and applied to "buildings of national importance and special interest". This list contains the Grade II listed buildings in the unparished area of the city to the north and west of the Chester city walls.

The listed buildings in this area of the city are mainly those resulting in its expansion outside the walls from the middle of the 18th century, and includes houses, public houses, hotels, shops, churches and associated structures, schools, and mileposts. In 1779 the Chester Canal, later part of the Shropshire Union Canal, opened and passes through this area. There are listed structures associated with the canal, including locks, bridges, and a boatyard.

See also

Grade I listed buildings in Cheshire West and Chester
Grade II* listed buildings in Cheshire West and Chester
Grade II listed buildings in Chester (central)
Grade II listed buildings in Chester (east)
Grade II listed buildings in Chester (south)

References
Citations

Sources

 
 

 North and west
Chester (north and west)